The San Marino men's national pitch and putt team represents san Marino in the pitch and putt international competitions. It is managed by the Federazione Sanmarinese Pitch and Putt (FSPP).

It was member of the European Pitch and Putt Association, and associated member of the Federation of International Pitch and Putt Associations (FIPPA). San Marino reached the 6th place in the European Pitch and Putt Championship in 2005 and the 8th place in the Pitch and Putt World Cup in 2004.

In 2009, vacated their membership of FIPPA and EPPA and joined another international association, IPPA.

National team

Players
National team in the World Cup 2008
 Marco Galassi
 Loris Riccardi
 Roberto Bianchi

National team in the European Championship 2007
Giulio Caramaschi
Emanuele Vannucci
Massimo Lazzari
Loris Riccardi
Marco Galassi
Ermanno Vergnani

Notes and references

See also
World Cup Team Championship
European Team Championship

National pitch and putt teams
Pitch and putt